Television in Austria was introduced in 1955. The country uses DVB-T for broadcasting. Analog television was completely shut down on 7 June 2011. Austrian television was monopolised by government-owned television stations until 1996. The first private television station in Austria was ATV.

List of channels

Public
ORF 1 (also in HD)
ORF 2 (also in HD)
ORF 2 Europe
ORF III
ORF Sport +
3sat - public channel in association with ORF, ARD, ZDF and SRF

Commercial
ATV
ATV II (DE)
Puls 4
Puls 24 (DE)
Servus TV
Geo Television (DE)
Kanal Telemedial (DE)
Melodie Express (DE)
Sky Krimi

Non-Commercial
Okto (DE)
FS1
dorf (DE)

Affiliates of German TV Channels
ProSieben Austria
Sat.1 Österreich
Kabel eins Austria
MTV Austria (only local advertisement-break aways)
Nick Austria
RTL2 Austria (only local advertisement-break aways)
RTL Austria (only local advertisement-break aways)
Comedy Central Austria (only local advertisement-break aways)
Vox Austria (only local advertisement-break aways)
N-tv Österreich (only local advertisement-break aways)
RTLup Österreich (only local advertisement-break aways)
sixx Austria (only local advertisement-break aways)
Sky Österreich (DE) (only local advertisement-break aways)

Local
LT1 (DE) (Linz)
Innsat.TV (DE) (Upper Austria)
P3tv (DE) (St. Pölten)
Austria24 TV (DE) (regional - Perg)
LinzLand TV (DE) (Linz-Land)
M4 Mostviertelfernsehen (DE) (Amstetten)
Mühlviertel TV (DE) (regional - Freistadt)
RTS Regionalfernsehen Salzburg (DE) (Salzburg)
RTV Regionalfernsehen OÖ (DE) (Garsten)
Schau TV (DE) (Vienna, Burgenland, & Lower Austria; eventually Centrope)
Tirol TV (DE) (Innsbruck, Tyrol)
W24 (DE) (Vienna)
WT1 (DE) (regional - Wels)
RE eins (DE) (Reutte District)
Kanal3 (DE) (West Styria - West, West & Graz, Mur-Mürztal regional, & Mur-Mürztal regional cable)

Pay TV
Sky Austria
AustriaSat
HD Plus Austria
UPC Austria
A1 TV

Most-viewed channels
The channels with the largest viewing share in 2022 are:

See also 
List of German-language television channels

References

Bibliography

Bibliography Television in Austria (Site "Histoire de la télévision"